Juan Pedro Toledo Domínguez (born June 17, 1978 in Huatabampo, Sonora) is a sprint athlete from Mexico. He twice won the gold medal in the men's 200 metres at the Central American and Caribbean Games, and competed for his native country at two consecutive Summer Olympics, starting in 2000.

Competition record

References

 

1978 births
Living people
Mexican male sprinters
Sportspeople from Sonora
Athletes (track and field) at the 2000 Summer Olympics
Athletes (track and field) at the 2004 Summer Olympics
Athletes (track and field) at the 1999 Pan American Games
Athletes (track and field) at the 2003 Pan American Games
Athletes (track and field) at the 2007 Pan American Games
Olympic athletes of Mexico
Central American and Caribbean Games gold medalists for Mexico
Competitors at the 1998 Central American and Caribbean Games
Competitors at the 2002 Central American and Caribbean Games
Central American and Caribbean Games medalists in athletics
Pan American Games competitors for Mexico
21st-century Mexican people